The 16th edition of the annual Hypo-Meeting took place on June 16 and June 17, 1990 in Götzis, Austria. The track and field competition featured a decathlon (men) and a heptathlon (women) event.

Men's Decathlon

Schedule

June 16

June 17

Records

Results

Women's Heptathlon

Schedule

June 16

June 17

Records

Notes

See also
 1990 Decathlon Year Ranking
1990 European Championships in Athletics – Men's Decathlon
1990 European Championships in Athletics – Women's heptathlon

References
 decathlon2000
 decathlonfans
 1990 Year Ranking Decathlon

1990
Hypo-Meeting
Hypo-Meeting